The following is a chronology of National Football League home stadiums, that is, all home stadiums of teams currently playing in the National Football League (NFL), and their locations and capacities. It contains all past and present (in bold) home stadiums used by the current 32 members of the National Football League since 1920, along with future home stadiums presently under construction (in italics immediately above the present stadium). It is ordered by the conference and division to which the team belongs.

Soldier Field in Chicago, home of the Chicago Bears is the oldest stadium in the league having opened in 1924. The stadium that has been used the longest by an NFL team is Lambeau Field, home of the Green Bay Packers since 1957.

Stadiums represent a considerable expense to a community, and thus their construction, use, and funding often enters the public discourse. Also, given the perceived advantage a team gets from playing in their home stadium, particular attention is given in the media to the peculiarities of each stadium's environment.  Weather, playing surface (either natural or artificial turf), and the presence or lack of a roof or dome all contribute to giving each team its home-field advantage.

Home stadiums
{| class="wikitable sortable plainrowheaders" style="font-size: 100%; text-align: center; width: 100%;"
|-
| style="background: #FF0000" align="center" colspan="7"|AFC
|-
| style="background: #E77471" align="center" colspan="7"|AFC East
|-
! style="width:15%; background: #FFCCCC;" | Team(former names)
! style="width:25%; background: #FFCCCC;" | Stadium(former names)
! style="width:10%;background: #FFCCCC;" | Years used
! style="width:5%; background: #FFCCCC;" | Capacity
! style="width:5%;background: #FFCCCC;" | Opened
! style="width:10%;background: #FFCCCC;" | Surface
! style="width:10%; background: #FFCCCC;" | Location
|-
! style="background: #ececec;" rowspan=3 | Buffalo Bills
| Highmark Stadium  (2021–present)Bills Stadium (2020–2021) New Era Field (2016–2020)Ralph Wilson Stadium (1997–2016)Rich Stadium (1973–1997)
| 1973–present
| 73,079
| 1973
| A-Turf Titan (2011–current)AstroPlay (2003–2010)AstroTurf (1973–2002)
| Orchard Park, New York
|-
| Rogers CentreSkyDome (1989–2005)
| 2008–2013(Bills Toronto Series)
| 54,000
| 1989
| FieldTurf
| Toronto
|-
| War Memorial Stadium
| 1960–1972
| 46,500
| 1937
| Grass
| Buffalo, New York
|-
! style="background: #ececec;" rowspan=2 | Miami Dolphins
| Hard Rock Stadium (2016–present)Sun Life Stadium (2010–2016)Land Shark Stadium (2009)Dolphin(s) Stadium (2005–2009)Pro Player Park/Stadium (1996–2005)Joe Robbie Stadium (1987–1996)
| 1987–present
| 65,000
| 1987
| Grass
| Miami Gardens, Florida
|-
| Miami Orange Bowl
| 1966–1986
| 74,476
| 1937
| Grass (1966–1969)Poly-Turf (1970–1976)PAT (1977–1986)
| Miami
|-
! style="background: #ececec;" rowspan=6 | New England Patriots(Boston Patriots)
| Gillette Stadium (2002–present) CMGi Field (2002)
| 2002–present
| 66,829
| 2002
| FieldTurf (mid-2006–current)Grass (2002–mid-2006)
| rowspan=2 | Foxborough, Massachusetts
|-
|Foxboro StadiumSullivan Stadium (1983–1989)Schaefer Stadium (1971–1982)
| 1971–2001
| 60,292
| 1971
| Grass (1991–2001)AstroTurf (197x–1990)Poly-Turf (1971–197x)
|-
| Harvard Stadium
| 1970
| 30,898
| 1903
| Grass
| Boston
|-
| Alumni Stadium
| 1969
| 44,500
| 1957
| Grass
| Chestnut Hill, Massachusetts
|-
| Fenway Park
| 1963–1968
| 33,524
| 1912
| Grass
| rowspan=2 | Boston, Massachusetts
|-
| Boston University Field
| 1960–1962
| >9,000
| 1915
| Grass
|-
! style="background: #ececec;" rowspan=4 | New York Jets(New York Titans)
| MetLife Stadium (2010–present)New Meadowlands Stadium (2010)
| 2010–present
| 82,500
| 2010
| FieldTurf
| rowspan=2 | East Rutherford, New Jersey
|-
| Giants Stadium
| 1984–2009
| 79,469 
| 1976
| FieldTurf (2003–2010)Grass (2000–2002)AstroTurf (1976–1999)
|-
| Shea Stadium
| 1964–1983
| 57,800
| 1964
| Grass
| Queens, New York
|-
| Polo Grounds
| 1960–1963
| 55,000
| 1891
| Grass
| Manhattan, New York
|-
| style="background: #E77471" align="center" colspan="7"|AFC North
|-
! style="width:15%; background: #FFCCCC;" | Team(former names)
! style="width:25%; background: #FFCCCC;" | Stadium(former names)
! style="width:10%;background: #FFCCCC;" | Years used
! style="width:5%; background: #FFCCCC;" | Capacity
! style="width:5%;background: #FFCCCC;" | Opened
! style="width:10%;background: #FFCCCC;" | Surface
! style="width:15%; background: #FFCCCC;" | Location
|-
! style="background: #ececec;" rowspan=2 | Baltimore Ravens
| M&T Bank Stadium (2003–present)Ravens Stadium (2002)PSINet Stadium (1998–2001)
| 1998–present
| 71,008
| 1998
| Grass (2016–present)Sportexe Momentum Turf(2003–2015)Grass (1998–2002)
| rowspan=2 | Baltimore
|-
| Memorial Stadium
| 1996–1997
| 53,371
| 1950
| Grass
|-
! style="background: #ececec;" rowspan=3 | Cincinnati Bengals
| Paycor Stadium (2022–present)Paul Brown Stadium (2000–2022)
| 2000–present
| 65,515
| 2000
| Field Turf (2003–present)Grass (2000–2002)
| rowspan=3 | Cincinnati
|-
| Cinergy Field (1997–1999)Riverfront Stadium (1970–1996)
| 1970–1999
| 59,754
| 1970
| AstroTurf
|-
| Nippert Stadium
| 1968–1969
| 35,000
| 1924
| Grass
|-
! style="background: #ececec;" rowspan=2 | Cleveland Browns
| FirstEnergy Stadium (2013–present)Cleveland Browns Stadium (1999–2012)
| 1999–present
| 67,895
| 1999
| Grass
| rowspan=2 | Cleveland
|-
| Cleveland Stadium
| 1946–1995
| 74,400
| 1932
| Grass
|-
! style="background: #ececec;" rowspan=4 | Pittsburgh Steelers(Pittsburgh Pirates)
| Acrisure Stadium (2022–present)Heinz Field (2001–2022)
| 2001–present
| 68,400
| 2001
| Grass
| rowspan=4 | Pittsburgh
|-
| Three Rivers Stadium
| 1970–2000
| 59,000
| 1970
| AstroTurf (1982–2000)Tartan Turf (1970–1981)
|-
| Pitt Stadium
| 1958–1969
| 56,150
| 1925
| Grass
|-
| Forbes Field
| 1933–1963
| 35,000
| 1909
| Grass
|-
| style="background: #E77471" align="center" colspan="7"|AFC South
|-
! style="width:15%; background: #FFCCCC;" | Team(former names)
! style="width:25%; background: #FFCCCC;" | Stadium(former names)
! style="width:10%;background: #FFCCCC;" | Years used
! style="width:5%; background: #FFCCCC;" | Capacity
! style="width:5%;background: #FFCCCC;" | Opened
! style="width:10%;background: #FFCCCC;" | Surface
! style="width:10%; background: #FFCCCC;" | Location
|-
! style="background: #ececec;" | Houston Texans
| NRG Stadium (2014–present)Reliant Stadium (2002–2013)
| 2002–present
| 71,500
| 2002
| UBU Sports Speed Series S5-M (2016–present)Grass (2002–2015)
| Houston
|-
! style="background: #ececec;" rowspan=3 | Indianapolis Colts(Baltimore Colts)
| Lucas Oil Stadium (2008–present)
| 2008–present
| 67,000
| 2008
| FieldTurf
| rowspan=2 | Indianapolis
|-
| RCA Dome (1994–2007)Hoosier Dome (1984–1993)
| 1984–2007
| 57,980
| 1983
| Field Turf (2005–2008)AstroTurf (1984–2004)
|-
| Memorial Stadium
| 1953–1983
| 53,371
| 1950
| Grass
| Baltimore, Maryland
|-
! style="background: #ececec;" | Jacksonville Jaguars
| TIAA Bank Field (2018–present)EverBank Field (2010–2017)Jacksonville Municipal Stadium (2007–2009)Alltel Stadium (1995–2006)
| 1995–present
| 67,246
| 1995
| Grass
| Jacksonville, Florida
|-
! style="background: #ececec;" rowspan=6 | Tennessee Titans(Tennessee Oilers)(Houston Oilers)
| Nissan Stadium (2015–present)LP Field (2006–2014)The Coliseum (2002–2005)Adelphia Coliseum (1999–2001)
| 1999–present
| 67,000
| 1999
| Grass
| rowspan=2 | Nashville, Tennessee
|-
| Vanderbilt StadiumDudley Field (1922–1981)
| 1998
| 41,000
| 1922
| AstroTurf
|-
| Liberty Bowl Memorial Stadium
| 1997
| 62,380
| 1965
| Grass
| Memphis, Tennessee
|-
| Astrodome NRG Astrodome (2014–present)Reliant Astrodome (2002–2013)Astrodome (1968–2002)
| 1968–1996
| 62,439
| 1965
| AstroTurf
| rowspan=3 | Houston, Texas
|-
| Rice Stadium
| 1965–1967
| 70,000
| 1950
| Grass
|-
| Jeppesen StadiumRobertson Stadium (1980–2012)
| 1960–1964
| 32,000
| 1942
| Grass
|-
| style="background: #E77471" align="center" colspan="7"|AFC West
|-
! style="width:15%; background: #FFCCCC;" | Team(former names)
! style="width:25%; background: #FFCCCC;" | Stadium(former names)
! style="width:10%;background: #FFCCCC;" | Years used
! style="width:5%; background: #FFCCCC;" | Capacity
! style="width:5%;background: #FFCCCC;" | Opened
! style="width:10%;background: #FFCCCC;" | Surface
! style="width:10%; background: #FFCCCC;" | Location
|-
! style="background: #ececec;" rowspan=2 | Denver Broncos
| Empower Field at Mile High (2019–present)Broncos Stadium at Mile High (2018)Sports Authority Field at Mile High (2011–2017)INVESCO Field at Mile High (2001–2010)
| 2001–present
| 76,125
| 2001
| Grass
| rowspan=2 | Denver
|-
| Mile High StadiumBears Stadium (1960–1968)
| 1960–2000
| 76,273
| 1948
| Grass
|-
! style="background: #ececec;" rowspan=3 | Kansas City Chiefs(Dallas Texans)
| Arrowhead Stadium (1972–present)
| 1972–present
| 79,409
| 1972
| Grass (1994–present)Tartan Turf (1972–1993)
| rowspan=2 | Kansas City, Missouri
|-
| Municipal Stadium
| 1963–1971
| 47,500
| 1923
| Grass
|-
| Cotton Bowl
| 1960–1962
| 68,252
| 1932
| Grass
| Dallas
|-
! style="background: #ececec;" rowspan=6 | Las Vegas Raiders(Oakland Raiders)(Los Angeles Raiders)
| Allegiant Stadium (2020–present)
| 2020–present
| 65,000
| 2020
| Grass
| Paradise, Nevada
|-
| Oakland Coliseum RingCentral Coliseum (2019–present)Oakland-Alameda County Coliseum (1960–1983,1995–1997,2016–2018) O.co Coliseum (2011–2015)McAfee Coliseum (2004–2007)Network Associates Coliseum (1999–2004)
| 1995–20191966–1981
| 63,146
| 1966
| Grass
| Oakland, California
|-
| Los Angeles Memorial Coliseum
| 1982–1994
| 101,574
| 1923
| Grass
| Los Angeles
|-
| Frank Youell Field
| 1962–1965
| 22,000
| 1962
| Grass
| Oakland, California
|-
| Candlestick ParkMonster Park (2004–2008)San Francisco Stadium at Candlestick Point (2003–2004)3Com Park (1995–2002)Candlestick Park (1960–1994, 2008–2013)
| 1960–1961
| UNK (currently 64,450)
| 1960
| Grass (1979–present)AstroTurf (1971–1978)
| rowspan=2 | San Francisco, California
|-
| Kezar Stadium
| 1960
| 59,942
| 1925
| Grass
|-
! style="background: #ececec;" rowspan=5 | Los Angeles Chargers(San Diego Chargers)
| SoFi Stadium (2020–present)
| 2020–present
| 70,000
| 2020
| Artificial Turf
| Inglewood, California
|-
|Dignity Health Sports Park (2019–present)StubHub Center (2017–2018)The Home Depot Center (2003–2013)
| 2017–2019
| 30,000
| 2003
| Grass
| Carson, California
|-
| San Diego StadiumSDCCU Stadium (2017–2020)Qualcomm Stadium (1992–2016)Jack Murphy Stadium (1980–1992)San Diego Stadium (1967–1980)
| 1967–2016
| 71,294
| 1967
| Grass
| rowspan=2 | San Diego
|-
| Balboa Stadium
| 1961–1966
| 34,000
| 1914
| Grass
|-
| Los Angeles Memorial Coliseum
| 1960
| 101,574
| 1923
| Grass
| Los Angeles, California
|-
| style="background: #0000FF" align="center" colspan="7"|NFC
|-
| style="background: #6698FF" align="center" colspan="7"|NFC East
|-
! style="width:15%; background: #D0E7FF;" | Team(former names)
! style="width:25%; background: #D0E7FF;" | Stadium(former names)
! style="width:10%;background: #D0E7FF;" | Years Used
! style="width:5%; background: #D0E7FF;" | Capacity
! style="width:5%;background: #D0E7FF;" | Opened
! style="width:10%;background: #D0E7FF;" | Surface
! style="width:10%; background: #D0E7FF;" | Location
|-
! style="background: #ececec;" rowspan=3 | Dallas Cowboys
| AT&T Stadium (2013–present)Cowboys Stadium (2009–2013)
| 2009–present
| 80,000–100,000
| 2009
| Matrix artificial turf
| Arlington, Texas
|-
| Texas Stadium
| 1971–2008
| 65,675
| 1971
| RealGrass (2001–2008)Tartan Turf (1971–1980)AstroTurf (1981–2000)
| Irving, Texas
|-
| Cotton Bowl
| 1960–1971
| 68,252
| 1932
| AstroTurf (1970–1971)Grass (1960–1969)
| Dallas, Texas
|-
! style="background: #ececec;" rowspan=6 | New York Giants
| MetLife Stadium (2010–present)New Meadowlands Stadium (2010)
| 2010–present
| 82,500
| 2010
| Field Turf
| rowspan=2 | East Rutherford, New Jersey
|-
| Giants Stadium
| 1976–2009
| 79,469
| 1976
| Field Turf (2003–2009)Grass (2000–2002)AstroTurf (1976–1999)
|-
| Shea Stadium
| 1975
| 57,800
| 1964
| Grass
| Queens, New York
|-
| Yale Bowl
| 1973–1974
| 64,269
| 1914
| Grass
| New Haven, Connecticut
|-
| Yankee Stadium
| 1956–1973
| 67,000
| 1923
| Grass
| The Bronx, New York
|-
| Polo Grounds
| 1925–1955
| 55,000
| 1891
| Grass
| Manhattan, New York
|-
! style="background: #ececec;" rowspan=6 | Philadelphia Eagles
| Lincoln Financial Field (2003–present)
| 2003–present
| 68,500
| 2003
| Grass
| rowspan=6 | Philadelphia
|-
| Veterans Stadium
| 1971–2002
| 65,386
| 1971
| AstroTurf (1971–2000)NexTurf (2001–2002)
|-
| Franklin Field
| 1958–1970
| 52,593
| 1895
| AstroTurf (1969–1970)Grass (1958–1968)
|-
| Connie Mack StadiumShibe Park (1909–1953)
| 1942–19571940
| 23,000
| 1909
| Grass
|-
| John F. Kennedy StadiumPhiladelphia Municipal Stadium (1927–1963)Sesquicentennial Stadium (1926)
| 19411936–1939
| 75,000
| 1926
| Grass
|-
| Baker BowlPhiladelphia Base Ball Grounds (1887–1895)National League Park (1895–1913)
| 1933–1935
| 20,000
| 1887
| Grass
|-
! style="background: #ececec;" rowspan=5 | Washington Commanders(Washington Football Team)(Washington Redskins)(Boston Redskins)(Boston Braves)
| FedExField (2000–present)Jack Kent Cooke Stadium (1997–1999)
| 1997–present
| 82,000
| 1997
| Grass
| Landover, Maryland
|-
| RFK StadiumD.C. Stadium (1961–1968)
| 1961–1996
| 55,672
| 1961
| Grass
| rowspan=2 | Washington, D.C.
|-
| Griffith StadiumNational Park (1911–1920)
| 1937–1960
| 32,000
| 1911
| Grass
|-
| Fenway Park
| 1933–1936
| 33,524
| 1912
| Grass
| rowspan=2 | Boston, Massachusetts
|-
| Braves FieldNational League Park (1936–1941)
| 1932
| 40,000
| 1915
| Grass
|-
| style="background: #6698FF" align="center" colspan="7"|NFC North
|-
! style="width:15%; background: #D0E7FF;" | Team(former names)
! style="width:25%; background: #D0E7FF;" | Stadium(former names)
! style="width:10%;background: #D0E7FF;" | Years Used
! style="width:5%; background: #D0E7FF;" | Capacity
! style="width:5%;background: #D0E7FF;" | Opened
! style="width:10%;background: #D0E7FF;" | Surface
! style="width:10%; background: #D0E7FF;" | Location
|-
! style="background: #ececec;" rowspan=5 | Chicago Bears(Chicago Staleys)(Decatur Staleys)
| Soldier Field (2003–present)
| 2003–present
| 63,000
| 1924
| Grass
| Chicago
|-
| Memorial Stadium
| 2002
| 69,249
| 1923
| AstroPlay
| Champaign, Illinois
|-
| Soldier FieldMunicipal Grant Park Stadium (1924–1925)
| 1971–2001
| 61,500
| 1924
| Grass (1988–2001)AstroTurf (1971–1987)
| rowspan=2 | Chicago, Illinois
|-
| Wrigley Field
| 1921–1970
| 40,000
| 1914
| Grass
|-
| Staley Field
| 1920
| 1,500
| 1915
| Grass
| Decatur, Illinois
|-
! style="background: #ececec;" rowspan=5 | Detroit Lions(Portsmouth Spartans)
| Ford Field (2002–present)
| 2002–present
| 65,000
| 2002
| Field Turf
| Detroit
|-
| Pontiac Silverdome
| 1975–2001
| 80,311
| 1975
| AstroTurf
| Pontiac, Michigan
|-
| Tiger StadiumBriggs Stadium (1938–1960)
| 1938–1974
| 52,416
| 1912
| Grass
| rowspan=2 | Detroit, Michigan
|-
| University of Detroit Stadium
| 1934–1937
| 25,000
| 1928
| Grass
|-
| Universal StadiumSpartan Municipal Stadium (1970–present)
| 1930–1933
| 8,200
| 1930
| Grass
| Portsmouth, Ohio
|-
! style="background: #ececec;" rowspan=8 | Green Bay Packers 
| Lambeau Field (1957–present)New City Stadium (1957–1965)
| 1957–present
| 81,435
| 1957
| Grass
| Green Bay, Wisconsin
|-
| Milwaukee County Stadium
| 1953–1994(2–4 games yearly)
| 53,192
| 1953
| Grass
| rowspan=4 | Milwaukee
|-
| Marquette Stadium
| 1952(3 games)
| 15,000
| 1924
| Grass
|-
| Wisconsin State Fair Park
| 1934–1951(2–3 games yearly)
| UNK
| 1891
| Grass
|-
| Borchert Field
| 1933(1 game)
| 13,000
| 1888
| Grass
|-
| City Stadium
| 1926–1956
| 25,000
| 1926
| Grass
| rowspan=3 | Green Bay, Wisconsin
|-
| Bellevue Park
| 1923–1925
| 4,000–5,000
| 1923
| Grass
|-
| Hagemeister Park
| 1919–1922
| UNK
| 1919
| Grass
|-
! style="background: #ececec;" rowspan=4 | Minnesota Vikings
| U.S. Bank Stadium (2016–present)
| 2016–present
| 65,400
| 2016
| UBU Sports Speed Series S5-M
| rowspan=3| Minneapolis
|-
| TCF Bank Stadium
| 2014–2015
| 50,805
| 2009
| FieldTurf
|-
| Hubert H. Humphrey Metrodome
| 1982–2013
| 64,035
| 1982
| UBU-Intensity Series-S5-M Synthetic Turf  (2011–2013)Sportexe Momentum Turf (2010)Field Turf (2004–2009)AstroTurf (1987–2003)Superturf (1982–1986)
|-
| Metropolitan Stadium
| 1961–1981
| 45,919
| 1956
| Grass
| Bloomington, Minnesota
|-
| style="background: #6698FF" align="center" colspan="7"|NFC South
|-
! style="width:15%; background: #D0E7FF;" | Team(former names)
! style="width:25%; background: #D0E7FF;" | Stadium(former names)
! style="width:10%;background: #D0E7FF;" | Years used
! style="width:5%; background: #D0E7FF;" | Capacity
! style="width:5%;background: #D0E7FF;" | Opened
! style="width:10%;background: #D0E7FF;" | Surface
! style="width:10%; background: #D0E7FF;" | Location
|-
! style="background: #ececec;" rowspan=3 | Atlanta Falcons
| Mercedes-Benz Stadium (2017–present)
| 2017–present
| 71,000
| 2017
| Artificial turf (2017–present)
| rowspan=3 | Atlanta
|-
| Georgia Dome
| 1992–2016
| 71,149
| 1992
| Field Turf (2003–2016)AstroTurf (1992–2002)
|-
| Atlanta–Fulton County Stadium
| 1966–1991
| 62,000
| 1966
| Grass
|-
! style="background: #ececec;" rowspan=2 | Carolina Panthers
| Bank of America Stadium (2004–present)Ericsson Stadium (1996–2003)Carolinas Stadium (1995)
| 1996–present
| 73,779
| 1996
| Grass
| Charlotte, North Carolina
|-
| Frank Howard Field at Memorial Stadium
| 1995
| 80,301
| 1942
| Grass
| Clemson, South Carolina
|-
! style="background: #ececec;" rowspan=6 | New Orleans Saints
| Caesars Superdome (2021–present)Mercedes-Benz Superdome (2011–2021)Louisiana Superdome (1975–2010)
| 2006–present1975–2004
| 76,468
| 1975
| Sportexe Momentum Turf (2006–present)AstroPlay (2003–2004)AstroTurf (1975–2003)
| New Orleans
|-
| TIAA Bank Field
| One game in 2021
| 67,814
| 1995
| Grass
| Jacksonville, Florida
|-
| Tiger Stadium
| Four games in 2005
| 92,400
| 1924
| Grass
| Baton Rouge, Louisiana
|-
| Alamodome
| Three games in 2005
| 65,000
| 1993
| SportField
| San Antonio, Texas
|-
| Giants Stadium
| One game in 2005
| 79,469
| 1976
| FieldTurf 
| East Rutherford, New Jersey
|-
| Tulane Stadium
| 1967–1974
| 80,985
| 1926
| Poly-Turf (1971–1974)Grass (1967–1970)
| New Orleans, Louisiana
|-
! style="background: #ececec;" rowspan=2 | Tampa Bay Buccaneers
| Raymond James Stadium (1998–present)
| 1998–present
| 65,657
| 1998
| Grass
| rowspan=2 | Tampa, Florida
|-
| Tampa StadiumHoulihan's Stadium (1996–1997)Tampa Stadium (1976–1995)
| 1976–1997
| 74,301
| 1976
| Grass
|-
| style="background: #6698FF" align="center" colspan="7"|NFC West
|-
! style="width:15%; background: #D0E7FF;" | Team(former names)
! style="width:25%; background: #D0E7FF;" | Stadium(former names)
! style="width:10%;background: #D0E7FF;" | Years used
! style="width:5%; background: #D0E7FF;" | Capacity
! style="width:5%;background: #D0E7FF;" | Opened
! style="width:10%;background: #D0E7FF;" | Surface
! style="width:10%; background: #D0E7FF;" | Location
|-
! style="background: #ececec;" rowspan=8 | Arizona Cardinals(Phoenix Cardinals)(St. Louis Cardinals)(Chicago Cardinals)(Racine Cardinals)(Racine Normals)(Morgan Athletic Club)
| State Farm Stadium (2018–present)University of Phoenix Stadium (2006–2017)
| 2006–present
| 63,000
| 2006
| Grass
| Glendale, Arizona
|-
| Sun Devil Stadium
| 1988–2005
| 73,379
| 1958
| Grass
| Tempe, Arizona
|-
| Busch Stadium (II)
| 1966–1987
| 49,676
| 1966
| AstroTurf (1970–1987)Grass (1966–1969)
| rowspan=2 | St. Louis, Missouri
|-
| Busch Stadium (I)
| 1960–1965
| 30,500
| 1881
| Grass
|-
| Metropolitan Stadium
| 1959(2 games)
| 18,600
| 1956
| Grass
| Bloomington, Minnesota
|-
| Soldier FieldMunicipal Grant Park Stadium (1924–1925)
| 1959(4 games)
| 61,500
| 1924
| Grass
| rowspan=3 | Chicago, Illinois
|-
| Comiskey Park
| 1929–19581922–1925
| 52,000
| 1910
| Grass
|-
| Normal Park
| 1926–19281920–1921
| UNK
| UNK
| Grass
|-
! style="background: #ececec;" rowspan=8 | Los Angeles Rams(St. Louis Rams)(Cleveland Rams)
| SoFi Stadium (2020–present)
| 2020–present
| 70,000
| 2020
| Artificial Turf
| Inglewood, California
|-
| Los Angeles Memorial Coliseum
| 2016–20191946–1979
| 93,607
| 1923
| Grass
| Los Angeles, California
|-
| Edward Jones DomeTrans World Dome (1995–2001)The Dome at America's Center (2001–2002, 2016–present)
| 1995–2015
| 66,000
| 1995
| AstroTurf (2005–present)FieldTurf (2005–2010)AstroTurf (1995–2004)
| rowspan=2 | St. Louis, Missouri
|-
| Busch Stadium (II)
| 1995
| 49,676
| 1966
| AstroTurf
|-
| Anaheim Stadium
| 1980–1994
| 64,593
| 1966
| Grass
| Anaheim, California
|-
| League Park
| 1944–194519421937
| 21,414
| 1891
| Grass
| rowspan=3 | Cleveland, Ohio
|-
| Cleveland Stadium
| 1939–19411937
| 78,000
| 1932
| Grass
|-
| Shaw Stadium
| 1938
| UNK
| UNK
| Grass
|-
! style="background: #ececec;" rowspan=3 | San Francisco 49ers
| Levi's Stadium (2014–present)
| 2014–present
| 68,983
| 2014
| Grass
| Santa Clara, California
|-
| Candlestick ParkMonster Park (2005–2008)3Com Park (1995–2004)Candlestick Park (1960–1994, 2008–2013)
| 1971–2013
| 64,450
| 1960
| Grass (1979–present)AstroTurf (1971–1978)
| rowspan=2 | San Francisco, California
|-
| Kezar Stadium
| 1946–1970
| 59,942
| 1925
| Grass
|-
! style="background: #ececec;" rowspan=3 | Seattle Seahawks
| Lumen Field (2020–present)CenturyLink Field (2011–2019)Qwest Field (2004–2011)Seahawks Stadium (2002–2003)
| 2002–present''
| 68,000
| 2002
| Field Turf
| rowspan=3 | Seattle
|-
| Husky Stadium
| 2000–2001Three games in 1994
| 72,500
| 1920
| Field Turf
|-
| Kingdome
| 1976–1999
| 66,000
| 1976
| AstroTurf
|}

NFL International Series

The following stadiums have hosted, or will host, regular season games outside of the United States as part of the NFL International Series:

Temporary home stadiums

Occasionally, a team's home games are moved from their usual site to another location, usually either due to natural disasters, or to the stadium being in use for other events.  The list of temporary home stadiums''' is ordered by the date on which the game using the temporary location was played.

See also
List of current National Football League stadiums
Stadiums to host the Super Bowl (including future years)
Stadiums that have hosted the Pro Bowl
List of most consecutive games with touchdown passes in the National Football League at one stadium
List of NCAA Division I FBS football stadiums
List of NCAA Division I FCS football stadiums
List of American football stadiums by capacity
List of U.S. stadiums by capacity
List of North American stadiums by capacity
List of Canadian Football League stadiums
List of Major League Baseball stadiums
List of Major League Soccer stadiums
List of Major League Lacrosse stadiums
List of National Basketball Association arenas
List of National Hockey League arenas

References

External links
Map of NFL Stadiums

football
National Football League chronology